Leticia Cossettini (May 19, 1904 - December 11, 2004) was an Argentine teacher and pedagogue. She was a Konex Award laureate and was knighted in Italy.

Biography
Leticia Cossettini was born in San Jorge, Santa Fe Province, May 19, 1904. She was the daughter of Antonio Cossettini and Alpina Bodello, founders of schools in Gálvez. Her sister was Olga Cossettini.

Like her parents and her sister, she followed the career path of an educator. In 1921, she worked as a teacher in a normal school in Rafaela, where she distinguished herself by her sensitivity and her artistic expressions. Between 1935 and 1950, the Cossettini sisters developed a project called Escuela Serena, that they applied at the Experimental School Dr. Gabriel Carrasco in the Barrio Alberdi, city of Rosario. It transformed the traditional school into a more active one with learning experiences based on education criteria.

She died in Rosario, on December 11, 2004. The mayor of the city of Rafaela, Omar Perotti, signed a decree of honor and adherence "to the mourning for the death of Miss Leticia Cossettini."

Awards and honours
In 1985, the Municipality of Rosario granted Leticia Cossettini the recognition of Illustrious Citizen. In 1986, she received the Konex Award for Humanities as one of the best teachers (without gender distinction) in Argentina. In 1990, the Republic of Italy awarded her the title Cavaliere Ufficiale al Merito.

Selected publications
 1947, Teatro de Niños

References

1904 births
2004 deaths
People from Santa Fe Province
20th-century Argentine educators
Argentine women educators
20th-century Argentine writers
20th-century Argentine women writers
Argentine centenarians
Women centenarians